is a 2011 Japanese fantasy film. The film was directed by Ryūtarō Kajino, and it stars idols Uki Satake and Cocoro Takami.

Gyokairui Yamaoka Maiko made its international debut at the 2011 Yubari International Film Festival. It was subsequently released in Japanese cinemas on 22 October 2011.

Plot
One day, while picking up seashells along the beach, Kamoka spots a girl sprouting out of the water. The girl introduces herself as Maiko. And although this girl is dressed in a high school uniform and looks like a human, she is a type of fish. In the end, Kamoka takes Maiko back to her home.

Over time, the friendship between Kamoka and Maiko deepens. The pair was invited for dinner at Mochiro's home. At first, Kamoka had the wrong impression that Mochiro had romantic feelings towards Maiko. She later finds out that Mochiro was actually scheming to cook Maiko into fine cuisine dish. At the same time, Maiko starts to have a sudden transformation.

Cast
 Uki Satake as Maiko Yamaoka
 Cocoro Takami as Kamoko Negino
 Miho Matsushita as Yukaka Yamaoka 
 Sayaka Kato as Koharu		
 Takanori Shimomura as Dr. Billy
 Nobuhiko Okamoto as Kanikou	
 Kota Fukihara		
 Tsunekichi Takeoka
 Akakabuto Masuda		
 Yuki Saisho

References

External links
  
 

Japanese fantasy films
2011 fantasy films
2010s Japanese films